Las Vegas Strikers were an American soccer team, founded in 2003. The team were a member of the National Premier Soccer League (NPSL), the fourth tier of the American Soccer Pyramid, and play in the Southwest Conference.

The Strikers play their home matches at the Bettye Wilson Soccer Complex in Las Vegas, Nevada. The team's colors are yellow, white, red and black.

In 2006 the team's management announced that they would spend the 2007 NPSL season on hiatus, but after two seasons on hiatus, the team officially folded in 2008.

Year-by-year

External links
 Las Vegas Strikers

National Premier Soccer League teams
Sports teams in Las Vegas
Soccer clubs in Nevada
2003 establishments in Nevada
2008 disestablishments in Nevada
Association football clubs established in 2003
Association football clubs disestablished in 2008